Zorro the Avenger, a.k.a. The Shadow of Zorro, is a 1962 Spanish adventure western film directed by Joaquín Luis Romero Marchent, and starring Frank Latimore, María Luz Galicia, Howard Vernon, María Andersen and Ralph March.

It was one of the hits of the time from the western films. This film supposed a successor to the character of Coyote in films like La justicia del Coyote (1955).

Cast

References

External links
 

1962 films
1962 Western (genre) films
Films directed by Joaquín Luis Romero Marchent
Spanish Western (genre) films
Something Weird Video
Television series by Warner Bros. Television Studios